Nexon is a railway station in Nexon, Haute-Vienne, Nouvelle-Aquitaine, France. The station is located on the Limoges-Bénédictins - Périgueux and Nexon - Brive railway lines. The station is served by TER (local) services operated by SNCF.

Train services
The following services call at Nexon as of January 2021:
local service (TER Nouvelle-Aquitaine) Limoges - Thiviers - Périgueux - Bordeaux
local service (TER Nouvelle-Aquitaine) Limoges - Saint-Yrieix - Brive-la-Gaillarde

References

Railway stations in Haute-Vienne